Kamen is a settlement (naselje) in Split-Dalmatia County, Croatia, administratively part of the city of Split.

References

Populated places in Split-Dalmatia County